Lodovico Morosini (died 1407) was a Roman Catholic prelate who served as Bishop of Modon (1390–1407) and Bishop of Capodistria (1364–1390).

Biography
On 16 October 1364, Lodovico Morosini was appointed during the papacy of Urban V as Bishop of Capodistria. On 27 July 1365, he was consecrated bishop by Domenico Gaffaro, Bishop of Asolo, with Luca, Bishop of Cardica, and Giovanni Grandis, Bishop of Novigrad, serving as co-consecrators. On 21 November 1390, he was appointed during the papacy of Pope Boniface IX as Bishop of Modon. He served as Bishop of Modon until his death in 1407.

References 

Bishops appointed by Pope Urban V
Bishops appointed by Pope Boniface IX
1407 deaths
14th-century Roman Catholic bishops in the Republic of Venice